Joseph-Séraphin-Aimé Ashby (April 29, 1876 – March 5, 1962) was a Canadian politician in the province of Quebec.

Born in Sainte-Marie-de-Monnoir, Quebec, the son of George Ashby and Euphrosine Messier, Ashby was educated at the college of Sainte-Marie-de-Monnoir and the Université Laval at Montreal. He became a notary public in 1904 and practice in Lachine. He was elected to the Legislative Assembly of Quebec for the electoral district of Jacques-Cartier in the 1916 election. A Quebec Liberal, he was re-elected in the 1919 election and was defeated in the 1923 election. From 1923 to 1925, he was mayor of Lachine.

References
 

1876 births
1962 deaths
Mayors of places in Quebec
Quebec Liberal Party MNAs